Lipyagi is a rural locality (a khutor) in Starooskolsky District, Belgorod Oblast, Russia. The population was 19 as of 2010. There are 2 streets.

Geography 
Lipyagi is located 13 km northwest of Stary Oskol (the district's administrative centre) by road. Fedoseyevka is the nearest rural locality.

References 

Rural localities in Starooskolsky District